Straight, Clean and Simple is the fourth studio album by Anne Murray issued in 1971 on Capitol Records. Outside Canada, where Anne Murray was not so well known, it was simply titled Anne Murray. The album contained material by Burt Bacharach, Hal David, Kenny Rogers and Kin Vassy. The album peaked at No.4 on the RPM album chart in Canada on 27 March 1971.

Track listing
"It Takes Time" (Shirley Eikhard)
"People's Park" (Brent Titcomb)
"One Day I Walk" (Bruce Cockburn)
"Child of Mine" (Carole King, Gerry Goffin)
"Sycamore Slick" (Titcomb, Vicky Taylor)
"Wishing Smiles Made It All True" (Richard Gael)
"Sing High, Sing Low" (Titcomb)
"Days of the Looking Glass" (Gene MacLellan)
"A Stranger in My Place" (Kenny Rogers, Kin Vassy)
"I'll Never Fall In Love Again" (Burt Bacharach, Hal David)

Personnel
Amos Garrett, Bill Richards, Bill Speer, Bobby Edwards, Brent Titcomb, Brian Ahern, Buddy Cage, Ron Rully, Skip Beckwith, Terry Clarke, Tommy Graham - musicians
Rick Wilkins - string arrangements

References

1971 albums
Anne Murray albums
Albums produced by Brian Ahern (producer)
Capitol Records albums